Graham Kelly may refer to:

 Graham Kelly (politician) (born 1941), New Zealand politician and High Commissioner to Canada
 Graham Kelly (football administrator) (born 1945), English football administrator
 Graham Kelly (footballer, born 1991), Irish professional footballer
 Graham Kelly (footballer, born 1997), Irish professional footballer